Happy Birthday (Happy Birthday – ) is a 2018 Thai television series starring Puttichai Kasetsin (Push), Lapassalan Jiravechsoontornkul (Mild) and Purim Rattanaruangwattana (Pluem).

Directed by Kanittha Kwunyoo and produced by GMMTV together with Nar-ra-tor, the series was one of the ten television series for 2018 showcased by GMMTV in their "Series X" event on 1 February 2018. It premiered on GMM 25 and LINE TV on 7 October 2018, airing on Sundays at 20:30 ICT and 22:30 ICT, respectively. The series concluded on 30 December 2018.

Cast and characters 
Below are the cast of the series:

Main 
 Puttichai Kasetsin (Push) as Tee
 Lapassalan Jiravechsoontornkul (Mild) as Thannam
 Purim Rattanaruangwattana (Pluem) as Tonmai

Supporting 
 Ployshompoo Supasap (Jan) as Noinha
 Thanaboon Wanlopsirinun (Na) as Phana
 Pronpiphat Pattanasettanon (Plustor) as a young Tee
 Wachirawit Ruangwiwat (Chimon) as a young Phana
 Santisuk Promsiri (Noom) as Chayt
 Suangsuda Lawanprasert (Namfon) as Orn
 Sorapong Chatree as Uncle Tai
 Kalaya Lerdkasemsap (Ngek) as Wan
 Daraneenute Pasutanavin (Top) as Mae Pueng
 Korn Khunatipapisiri (Ouajun) as Top
 Alysaya Tsoi (Alice) as Jane
 Yuenyong Intira as Due
 Sukol Sasijulaka (Jome) as Prat
 Kittipat Chalaruk (Golf) as Lookgolf
 Achita Sikamana (Im) as Chymphy

Guest role 
 Nachat Juntapun (Nicky) as an interviewer (Ep. 2)
 Leo Saussay as an interviewer (Ep. 2)
 Prachaya Ruangroj (Singto) as himself (Ep. 3)
 Perawat Sangpotirat (Krist) as himself (Ep. 3)
 Watchara Sukchum (Jennie) as herself (Ep. 3)
 Jirakit Thawornwong (Mek) as Puen

Soundtrack

References

External links 
 Happy Birthday on LINE TV
 GMMTV

Television series by GMMTV
Thai romantic fantasy television series
Thai drama television series
2018 Thai television series debuts
2018 Thai television series endings
GMM 25 original programming